is a Japanese international rugby union player who plays as a Centre. He currently plays for Suntory Sungoliath in Japan's domestic Top League.

References

1988 births
Living people
Japanese rugby union players
Japan international rugby union players
Rugby union centres
Tokyo Sungoliath players
Sunwolves players